Reese is an unincorporated community and census-designated place (CDP) in Blair County, Pennsylvania, United States. It was first listed as a CDP prior to the 2020 census.

The CDP is in east-central Blair County, in the eastern part of Frankstown Township.

References 

Census-designated places in Blair County, Pennsylvania
Census-designated places in Pennsylvania